Waleed Ali (born 3 November 1980) is a Kuwaiti footballer who played as midfielder for the Kuwait Premier League club Al Kuwait.

He previously played for Iran Pro League club Esteghlal. He formerly played for Khaitan and Al Kuwait. 
Waleed's most valuable goal came in the 20th Arabian Gulf Cup Final against Saudi Arabia. The match ended 1-0 for Kuwait, this meant Kuwait won the 10th title in the Arabian Gulf Cup.

Waleed Played two times in the Asian Cup, first in the 2004 Asian Cup and then in the 2011 Asian Cup.

International career

International goals
Scores and results list Kuwait's goal tally first.

Club career

Club Career Statistics
Last Update: 8 August 2011 

 Assist Goals

External links

Waleed Ali Hussein Jumah - International Appearances

See also
List of men's footballers with 100 or more international caps

References

1981 births
Living people
Kuwaiti footballers
Esteghlal F.C. players
Expatriate footballers in Iran
Kuwait international footballers
2011 AFC Asian Cup players
FIFA Century Club
Footballers at the 2002 Asian Games
Sportspeople from Kuwait City

Association football midfielders
Asian Games competitors for Kuwait
AFC Cup winning players
Kuwait Premier League players
Khaitan SC players
Kuwaiti expatriate sportspeople in Iran
Kuwait SC players
Kuwaiti expatriate footballers